Policia Federal may refer to:

Argentina 
 Argentine Federal Police

Brazil 
 Federal Police (Brazil)
 Brazilian Federal Highway Police
 Brazilian Federal Railroad Police

Mexico 
 Federal Police (Mexico)
 Federal Judicial Police, until 2002

See also 
 Federales,  slang for Mexican Federal Police
 Federal Police